The 2010 American Le Mans Series season was the 40th overall season for the IMSA GT Championship, and the twelfth as the American Le Mans Series presented by Tequila Patrón. It was also the first season in which the ALMS used a revised structure for its four classes, as well as the first year in a three-year sponsorship deal with Patrón. The season began with the 12 Hours of Sebring on March 20 and ended with the Petit Le Mans on October 2, completing nine total races.

The senior class, LMP, the new combination class of the old LMP1 and LMP2 classes, saw defending LMP1 champions Patrón Highcroft Racing with defending champion driver David Brabham and new teammate Simon Pagenaud took a 23-point victory in their Honda over Porsche driver Klaus Graf. The other carry over category GT (the former GT2 class) Flying Lizard Motorsports Porsche duo of Patrick Long and Jörg Bergmeister successfully defended their class championship over Risi Competizione Ferrari driver Gianmaria Bruni. There was no GT1 category left in the series.

In the two spec-racer classes Scott Tucker of Level 5 Motorsports was the dominant driver in the LMP Challenge class, winning five of the nine races in the class' first full season. After debuting for half of the 2009 season, the new GT Challenge class saw the Black Swan Racing Porsche of Jeroen Bleekemolen and Tim Pappas claim the class victory.

Schedule
The 2010 American Le Mans Series season features nine events, dropping the St. Petersburg round from 2009. Laguna Seca will no longer end the season but is instead moved to May and has been extended from four hours to six hours; this will allow the Petit Le Mans to conclude the season. The Utah Grand Prix at Miller Motorsports Park has also had its date pushed back to July due to the move by Laguna Seca. The Petit Le Mans will also form part of the inaugural Intercontinental Le Mans Cup for LMP1s.

Regulation changes
Introduced on August 16, 2009, IMSA announced a new class structure for the 2010 season in order to address costs. Several previous classes will be retained, while some new classes will be added. Le Mans Prototypes, which previously ran in the LMP1 and LMP2 categories, will be combined into a single LMP category for much of the season. IMSA will modify the LMP1 and LMP2 rules through performance balancing in order to allow the two to compete equally in the new single category. However, the 12 Hours of Sebring and Petit Le Mans endurance races will not use this unified class, instead reverting to the 2009 regulations as used by the Automobile Club de l'Ouest (ACO) at the 24 Hours of Le Mans. The championship points payout for these two events have yet to be determined by IMSA.

A new Le Mans Prototype category will be established as a feeder system for young or amateur drivers. This category, known as Le Mans Prototype Challenge (LMPC), will borrow from the Formula Le Mans Cup series in Europe by utilizing a spec racing format.  All teams will use Oreca FLM09 chassis, Chevrolet production V8s, and other standardized equipment. Along with the European Le Mans Series' (2010 season) Formula Le Mans, the ALMS LMPC makes up as its own class in the races throughout the season rather than racing as a support series.

With a lack of competitors in the former GT1 category, GT2 has been renamed to just GT and will be the premiere category for grand tourers in ALMS in 2010. The ALMS Challenge category, first established in 2009, will be expanded in 2010 and renamed as GT Challenge (GTC). The category will race for the full season for the first time. Porsche 911 GT3s from racing series other than the IMSA GT3 Cup Challenge will also be accepted for the first time.

Season results
Note that the Sebring and Petit Le Mans events will be held under ACO regulations requiring the LMP class to be split amongst LMP1 and LMP2.  The overall race winner, regardless of their LMP category, is listed here.

Class winners in the Petit Le Mans (LMP1, LMP2 and GT) receive an automatic entry to the 2011 24 Hours of Le Mans.

Overall winners in bold.

Championships
Points were awarded to the top ten cars and drivers which complete at least 70% of their class winner's distance. Teams with multiple entries only score the points of their highest finishing entry in each race. Drivers were required to drive a minimum of 45 minutes to earn points, except for the Long Beach event which required only 30 minutes.

Starting with the Utah race, drivers are required to complete a particular amount of the minimum number of laps in order to earn points. The number of laps vary depending on the course size.

Team championships
Teams with full season entries are awarded points in the team championships.  Teams which participated in a partial season or on a race-by-race basis are not included in these championships.

As long as they compete full season and comply with ACO regulations, the top LMP1, LMP2 and GT team at the end of the season receive an automatic entry to the 2011 24 Hours of Le Mans.

LMP standings
Although combined into a single LMP class for seven events, the LMP1 and LMP2 category rules are utilized for the Sebring and Petit Le Mans races.  The individual results and points for LMP1 and LMP2 are combined into the overall LMP standings.

LMPC standings
All teams utilize the Oreca FLM09 chassis with Chevrolet LS3 engine.

GT standings

GTC standings
All teams utilize variations of the Porsche 997 GT3 Cup.

Driver championships
Drivers who participated in races but failed to score points over the course of the season are not listed.

LMP standings
Although combined into a single LMP class for seven events, the LMP1 and LMP2 category rules are utilized for the Sebring and Petit Le Mans races.  The individual results and points for LMP1 and LMP2 are combined into the overall LMP standings.

LMPC standings
Drivers in the LMPC category are allowed to drive for more than one car during an event.  If a driver is in each car for a minimum of two hours each, he is allowed to score the points from whichever car he chooses.

GT standings

GTC standings

Team changes
Scott Sharp has created a new racing team, Extreme Speed Motorsports, for the 2010 season, and will be entering two Ferrari F430s in the GT class.
Rahal Letterman Racing have re-signed Bill Auberlen, Joey Hand, Tommy Milner and Dirk Müller for 2010.
Acura confirmed in November 2009 that they would return for the 2010 season with Highcroft Racing.
Simon Pagenaud will be joining Highcroft Racing for 2010. In addition, Marino Franchitti will join David Brabham and Pagenaud for three events at Sebring, Mazda Raceway Laguna Seca and Petit Le Mans.
AutoCon Motorsports have signed Pierre Ehret to drive their LMP Lola at Sebring, Petit Le Mans, and Laguna Seca. They also confirmed that regular drivers Bryan Willman and Tony Burgess will return for 2010, although former lead driver Chris McMurry has retired.
Intersport Racing has announced its LMPC lineup consists of Patrón GT3 Challenge drivers Mitch Pagery and Brian Wong.
2010 marked the withdrawal of the Dodge Viper from the series.

References

External links
 American Le Mans Series
 International Motor Sports Association

 
American Le Mans Series
American Le Mans Series seasons